This is a list of synagogues in Bucharest.

Synagogue of Calea Moșilor 
Chabad Lyubavitsh of Romania 

 
Bucharest
synagogues in Bucharest
Synagogues in Bucharest